Viktoras Meškauskas (born 4 November 1970) is a Lithuanian racewalker. He competed in the men's 20 kilometres walk at the 1992 Summer Olympics.

References

1970 births
Living people
Athletes (track and field) at the 1992 Summer Olympics
Lithuanian male racewalkers
Olympic athletes of Lithuania
Place of birth missing (living people)